Umbogintwini (a corruption of eZimbokodweni) is a suburb located approximately 23 km south-west of Durban, in KwaZulu-Natal, South Africa.

History 

In the early 1900s, Mr Arthur Chamberlain (uncle of British Prime Minister Neville Chamberlain) saw an opportunity to supply explosives to the gold mines in South Africa at a cheaper rate than he could supply from the Kynochs factory in Arklow, Ireland. In 1907, the Natal Colony (prior to the Union of South Africa in 1910) granted Kynochs Ltd a lease on 1,400 acres (566 hectares) of land south of the uMbokodweni River which was originally part of a reserve.

Mr Warner, a land surveyor from Brisbane in Australia was contracted to lay out the factory and village of Umbogintwini. A house had been built for him in the village before he moved 11 km south-west of the village on the farm which is today known as the seaside resort of Warner Beach.

The first road constructed in the village was Highbury Road which became the focus of the earliest amenities buildings and residences before the village expanded and Chamberlain Road became the next point for development in the village.

23 men and their families from the Kynochs factory in Arklow, Ireland, moved to the area from 1908 to assist with the construction of the Twini factory with the men living outside of Umbogintwini until the first houses in the village were built.

The factory officially opened for production in 1908 as Kynochs Ltd and was set up to produce explosives as well as chemicals including nitric and sulphuric acid needed in the production of the explosives. The name of the factory later changed to African Explosives and Industries (which later further changed to African Explosives and Chemical Industries) in 1924 before the ramping up of the production of explosives during World War 2. During World War 2, the Royal Navy maintained a presence when purpose-built double storey houses for the officers were constructed, on Highbury Road.

In the late 1950s and 1960s, the "new village", an extension of Umbogintwini, was developed north of Dickens Road.

Umbogintwini's post office received the corrected name in 1997.

The village did not develop much until December 2004 when 90 hectares comprising the village and golf course was sold to Keystone Investments for their Arbour Town Development and in 2006 Volvo opened its GTO plant in Umbogintwini.

Today, Highbury Road and Cocking Road do not exist due to the Arbour Town development however Chamberlain Road, Prince Street, Rees Road and Oppenheimer Road still exist today. Oppenheimer Road used to extend through the village, however today the section between Dickens Road and Junction 2 no longer exists as it now forms part of the Arbour Town development and Chamberlain Road now forms part of the Arbour Village housing complex.

Etymology 
"Umbogintwini'' is the corrupted version of the Zulu word Mbokodweni or eZimbokodweni meaning  “river where round stones are collected” which is named after the uMbokodweni River on which it lies on. The name "Umbogintwini'' itself is too long for many residents and thus today the suburb is commonly referred to as the shortened version of the name which is "Twini '' or even sometimes ''MBog".

Overview 
Umbogintwini is a mixed-use area comprising the industrial complex, the village and the Arbour Town/Galleria precinct.

The industrial complex accounts for most of Umbogintwini's land area, lying west of the South Coast railway. The industrial complex is well known as a major chemical and manufacturing hub in KwaZulu-Natal including companies such as Volvo, Toyota Boshoku, Toyota Tsusho, Yara South Africa, Dulux, BASF, Anchor Yeast, Dyefin Textiles, Acacia, Progas, The Beverage Company, Chemical Initiatives, Sammar and APM Terminals amongst others.

The small residential section known as "the village" lies on the northern section of the suburb between the railway and the N2 highway and consists of a post office, primary school and a park.

The Arbour Town/Galleria precinct lies on the southern part of the suburb between the railway and the N2 highway centered on the two major shopping centres, Galleria Mall, the largest shopping centre south of Durban and Arbour Crossing Shopping Centre. Arbour Town which includes Arbour Crossing is a mixed-use development situated along Arbour Road has seen tremendous growth with the addition of a Makro store and several motor dealerships and restaurants.

Geography 
Umbogintwini is situated on the southern banks of the uMbokodweni River approximately 8 km north-west of Amanzimtoti's CBD. Organisationally and Administratively, it is included in the eThekwini Metropolitan Municipality as a Southern Suburb and also forms the southernmost part of the South Durban Basin, the industrial and suburban south of Durban.

Umbogintwini is bordered by Lotus Park to the north, Athlone Park to the east, Amanzimtoti to the south, and eZimbokodweni to the west.

Transport

Rail 
Umbogintwini's railway station is located between Arbour Town and the industrial complex and is served by the commuter railway service of Metrorail. It lies on the South Coast Line which links Umbogintwini to Isipingo and Durban in the north-east and Amanzimtoti, Kingsburgh, Umgababa, Umkomaas, Scottburgh and Kelso in the south-west.

Road 
Umbogintwini's main road is Dickens Road stretching from Mfundi Mngadi Drive on the western boundary of the suburb to the N2 on the eastern boundary of the suburb.

The N2 highway runs past Umbogintwini bordering it to the east, separating it from the suburb of Athlone Park and links the suburb to Durban in the north and Amanzimtoti and Port Shepstone in the south. Access to Umbogintwini from the N2 is obtained through the Dickens Road off-ramp (Exit 144).

The other access ways to Umbogintwini include McGowan Place linking to the Arbour Crossing and Galleria Mall shopping centres in the south and Mfundi Mngadi Drive which links to the neighbouring townships of eZimbokodweni and KwaMakhutha to the west and Isipingo to the north.

References

Populated places in eThekwini Metropolitan Municipality